Baudignécourt is a former commune in the Meuse department in the Grand Est region in northeastern France. On 1 January 2019, it was merged into the new commune Demange-Baudignécourt.

Population

See also
Communes of the Meuse department

References

Former communes of Meuse (department)
Populated places disestablished in 2019